Jack Brewer may refer to:

Jack Brewer (American football) (born 1979), former American football safety 
Jack Brewer (athlete) (1914–1993), British Olympic athlete
Jack Brewer (baseball) (1918–2003), American baseball pitcher
Jack Brewer (bishop) (1929–2000), Roman Catholic Bishop of Lancaster, England
Jack Brewer (musician), American lead singer of the post-hardcore band Saccharine Trust

See also
John Brewer (disambiguation)